Eliya XI ( / Elīyā, 1700 - April 1778) was Patriarch of the Church of the East from 1722 to 1778, with his residence in Rabban Hormizd Monastery, near Alqosh, in modern Iraq. His father, the priest Hoshaba, was the brother of the previous patriarch Eliya X (died 14 December 1722). Upon that patriarch's death, Eliya XI was elected to the patriarchal see, and enthroned on 25 December 1722.

At the beginning of the Ottoman–Persian War (1743–1746), his residence, the Patriarchal Monastery of Rabban Hormizd, was attacked and looted in 1743. Faced with frequent conflicts between two mighty Islamic empires (Ottoman and Persian), local Christians in the frontier regions were constantly exposed to danger, not only in times of war, but also during the interwar years, since local Kurdish warlords were accustomed to attack Christian communities and monasteries. Patriarch Eliya XI tried to improve the increasingly worsening position of his Christian flock, by staying loyal to Ottoman authorities, but the local administration was frequently unable to provide effective protection.

In older historiography, he was designated as Eliya XI, but later renumbered as Eliya "XII" by some authors. After the resolution of several chronological questions, he was designated again as Eliya XI, and that numeration is generally accepted in recent scholarly works, with some exceptions.

See also
 Patriarch of the Church of the East
 List of Patriarchs of the Church of the East
 Assyrian Church of the East

Notes

References

External links 

Patriarchs of the Church of the East
18th-century bishops of the Church of the East
1700 births
1778 deaths
Bishops in the Ottoman Empire
18th-century archbishops
Assyrians from the Ottoman Empire
18th-century people from the Ottoman Empire